2C-T-7 is a psychedelic phenethylamine of the 2C family. In his book PiHKAL: A Chemical Love Story, Alexander Shulgin lists the dosage range as 10 to 30 mg. 2C-T-7 is generally taken orally, and produces psychedelic and entactogenic effects that last 8 to 15 hours. Up until Operation Web Tryp and three deaths, two of which involved the use of other drugs in addition to 2C-T-7, and one which involved an excessive insufflated dose, 2C-T-7 was sold commercially in Dutch and Japanese smartshops and online. It is known on the streets as Blue Mystic or 7th Heaven. There has been little real research done on this chemical other than Shulgin's comments in PiHKAL and a few small animal studies mostly aimed at detecting metabolites.

Pharmacology
The mechanism that produces the psychedelic and entactogenic effects of 2C-T-7 is most likely to result from action as a 5-HT2A serotonin receptor agonist in the brain, a mechanism of action shared by most currently-known hallucinogenic tryptamines and phenethylamines.

Effects

2C-T-7 is psychedelic. In PiHKAL, Shulgin records that the hallucinations are unique, and that the chemical may cause muscle tension and an altered vocal quality.

Deaths
The Partnership for a Drug-Free America reports that 2C-T-7 can be lethal even in small doses; however, they provide no source for their claim and of the three known deaths of 2C-T-7 intoxicated individuals, all involved either excessive insufflated doses or the concomitant ingestion of other stimulants such as ephedrine and MDMA. There have been at least three reported deaths related to 2C-T-7 use as of August 2007, mainly at insufflated doses of 30 mg or more or combined with stimulants such as MDMA, as well as a number of very uncomfortably intense effects and hospitalizations, these mostly followed insufflation of 2C-T-7. In January 2002, Rolling Stone published an article about 2C-T-7 entitled "The New (legal) Killer Drug", although the legal status of the drug was misrepresented in the article, as 2C-T-7 may have been already illegal under the United States' legally ambiguous analog act. A detailed response on the website Disinformation challenged the accuracy of much of the reporting in that Rolling Stone article.

All of these known deaths of individuals under the influence of 2C-T-7, therefore, occurred in those known either to be intoxicated with potentially deadly stimulants such as ephedrine or MDMA or after the individual insufflated an excessive amount of 2C-T-7—excessive being an amount greater than necessary to induce the full range of the drug's effects, such as the reported 35 mg insufflated dose taken by the individual who died in the fall of 2000.  This reported dose was characterized as "excessive" by the US DEA.

Legal status
Around the year 2000, 2C-T-7 began to change from an obscure chemical to a drug used at parties and clubs in North America and Europe as it became available through a number of grey-market commercial vendors. This aroused the attention of the authorities, and many countries have since scheduled the chemical.

Germany
2C-T-7 is scheduled in Germany. (BTMG)

Australia
In Australia, 2C-T-2 and 2C-T-7 are covered by the country's analogue drug laws.

Canada
As of October 31, 2016, 2C-T-7 is a controlled substance (Schedule III) in Canada.

China
As of October 2015 2C-T-7 is a controlled substance in China.

The Netherlands
The Netherlands was the first country in the world to ban 2C-T-7, after being sold in smartshops for a short period. After 2C-T-2 was first banned, 2C-T-7 quickly appeared on the market, but was soon banned as well. 2C-T-7 is a list I drug of the Opium Law.

Sweden
Schedule I in Sweden. 2C-T-7 was first classified as "health hazard" under the act Lagen om förbud mot vissa hälsofarliga varor (translated Act on the Prohibition of Certain Goods Dangerous to Health) as of April 1, 1999, under SFS 1999:58 that made it illegal to sell or possess.

United Kingdom
In 1999, Alexander Shulgin was sent a copy of a letter from the British Home Office to several of its administrative associates that in effect placed all compounds listed in PiHKAL into Class A.

United States
On September 20, 2002, 2C-T-7 was classified as a Schedule I substance in the United States by an emergency ruling by the DEA. On March 18, 2004, the DEA published a Final Rule in the Federal Register permanently placing 2C-T-7 in Schedule I. (69 FR 12794).

Notes

External links
 Erowid 2C-T-7 Vault
 PiHKAL #43 2C-T-7 by Alexander Shulgin
 2C-T-7 Entry in PiHKAL

2C (psychedelics)
Designer drugs
Thioethers
Propyl compounds